The Niger women's national football team represents Niger in international women's football. It is governed by the Nigerien Football Federation. It has played in four FIFA recognised matches, two of which were losses to Burkina Faso women's national football team in 2007. There is an under-20 women's national team who were supposed to participate in the 2002 African Women U-19 Championship but withdrew before playing a game. There are problems that impact the development of the women's game in Africa that effect Niger.

Team image

Background and development
Early development of the women's game at the time colonial powers brought football to the continent was limited as colonial powers in the region tended to take male concepts of patriarchy and women's participation in sport with them to local cultures that had similar concepts already embedded in them. The lack of later development of the national team on a wider international level symptomatic of all African teams is a result of several factors, including  limited access to education, poverty amongst women in the wider society, and fundamental inequality present in the society that occasionally allows for female specific human rights abuses.  When quality female football players are developed, they tend to leave for greater opportunities abroad. Continent wide, funding is also an issue, with most development money coming from FIFA, not the national football association. Future, success for women's football in Africa is dependent on improved facilities and access by women to these facilities.  Attempting to commercialise the game and make it commercially viable is not the solution, as demonstrated by the current existence of many youth and women's football camps held throughout the continent.

The Nigerien Football Federation was founded in 1967 and became a FIFA affiliate that same year.  The FIFA trigramme is NIG.  The national association does not have a full-time staffer dedicated to women, and there are no organisational or constitutional provisions specifically pertaining to the women's game.

No organised women's football programme existed in the country despite football being one of the most popular sports in the country by 2009. For women though, basketball is the most popular participation sport. In 2006, there were zero registered female players and zero registered football clubs for women only. Rights to broadcast the 2011 Women's World Cup in the country were bought by the African Union of Broadcasting and Supersport International.

Team
In 1985, almost no country in the world had a women's national football team including Niger who officially had no women's national senior A team before 2006 and only had their first FIFA recognised international in 2007 when they  competed at the Tournoi de Cinq Nations held in Ouagadougou.  On 2 September, they lost to Burkina Faso 0–10.  On 6 September, they lost to Burkina Faso 0–5. The country did not have a team competing in the 2010 African Women's Championships during the preliminary rounds or the 2011 All Africa Games. In June 2012, the team was not ranked in the world by FIFA. The country has never been ranked by FIFA.

The country has had a Niger women's national under-19 football team who have competed in the 2002 African Women U-19 Championship, the first edition of the competition to be held. They had a bye in the first round. In the quarterfinals, they were supposed to play Morocco but Niger withdrew from the competition.

Results and fixtures

The following is a list of match results in the last 12 months, as well as any future matches that have been scheduled.

Legend

2023

Coaching staff

Current coaching staff

Managerial history

Players

Current squad
 The following players were named on 10 October 2021 for the 2022 Africa Women Cup of Nations qualification tournament.
 Caps and goals accurate up to and including 30 October 2021.

Recent call-ups
The following players have been called up to a Niger  squad in the past 12 months.

Records

*Active players in bold, statistics correct as of 26 October 2021.

Most capped players

Top goalscorers

Competitive record

FIFA Women's World Cup

*Draws include knockout matches decided on penalty kicks.

Olympic Games

Africa Women Cup of Nations

*Draws include knockout matches decided on penalty kicks.

African Games

WAFU Women's Cup record

Honours

See also

Sport in Niger
Football in Niger
Women's football in Niger
Niger men's national football team

References

External links
Niger Football Federation website

W
African women's national association football teams
Football in Niger